Sasoma is a settlement in Nubra Valley, Ladakh consisting of villages such as the Gya village. A road is being constructed from Sasoma to Saser La by the Border Roads Organisation which will be the world first glaciated motorable road once completed. Another road, the Khalsar-Sasoma road with a bridge on the Chamesahn Lungpa stream, connects Khalsar to Sasoma.

References 

Ladakh